Vlastibořice is a municipality and village in Liberec District in the Liberec Region of the Czech Republic. It has about 400 inhabitants.

Administrative parts
Villages and hamlets of Jivina, Sedlíšťka and Slavíkov are administrative parts of Vlastibořice.

History
The first written mention of Vlastibořice is from 1357.

References

External links

Villages in Liberec District